Helicobia is a genus of flesh flies in the family Sarcophagidae. There are at least 30 described species in Helicobia.

Species

References

Further reading

External links

 

Sarcophagidae
Taxa named by Daniel William Coquillett
Oestroidea genera